The Arboretum Marcel Kroenlein (15 hectares), also known as the Arboretum de Roure, is a high-altitude arboretum located at 1,270 to 1,700 metres above sea level on the edge of the Mercantour National Park in Roure, Alpes-Maritimes, Provence-Alpes-Côte d'Azur, France. It is open daily.

The arboretum was conceived in 1987 when Michèle Ramin, now the arboretum's president, met Marcel Kroenlein, then director of the Jardin Exotique de Monaco. Its first trees were planted in 1988, and in 1989 artists first began to display their artwork on the site. Featured artists have included Arman, Folon, Ben, César. Every year the arboretum is organizing an exhibition sponsored by a contemporary artist : Andy Goldsworthy, Ousmane Sow.

The arboretum's mission is to collect hardwoods and conifers from the Alps and every mountains across the world, and to preserve the natural flora of the Alpes-Maritimes. The site features a variety of micro-climates, due to its Alpine and Mediterranean location and its varied topography, and is host to a wide variety of natural vegetation. Indigenous foliage is primarily pine and European larch. More than 300 additional species have been introduced to date.

The arboretum now contains a good collection of conifers, including Wollemi pine and Pinus culminicola, as well as varieties of cedar, fir, juniper, larch, spruce, etc. It also contains a collection of high-altitude maples from the Americas, Asia, and Europe, and ash trees, ginkgo, red oak, prunus, walnut, Sequoiadendron giganteum and so forth, and a collection of rare and endangered wild roses.

See also 
 List of botanical gardens in France

References 
 Arboretum Marcel Kroenlein (French)
 Jardins Remarquables article (French)
 Gralon.net entry (French)
 French Wikipedia article

Marcel Kroenlein, Arboretum
Marcel Kroenlein, Arboretum
1987 establishments in France